In sha'Allah (also inshallah) is an Arabic phrase for "God willing".

Inshallah or in sha Allah may also refer to:

Books
Inshallah (novel), a 1991 Italian novel by Oriana Fallaci
Inshallah: konflikten mellan Israel och Palestina, a 2001 Swedish book by Donald Boström
Inch'Allah, Marc-Édouard Nabe
Inch'Allah, Gérard Davet

Film and TV
Inch'Allah (1922 film), a French film directed by Marco de Gastyne and Franz Toussaint
Inshalla (1997 film) (ko), a Korean film by Min-Yong Lee with Min-su Choi, Yeong-ae Lee
Insha'Allah (2009 film)  a Pakistan film starring Mehwish Hayat, Mohib Mirza, Saife Hassan
Inch'Allah (2012 film), a French-Canadian film directed by Anaïs Barbeau-Lavalette
Inshallah (2020 film), an Indian film by Sanjay Leela Bhansali with Salman Khan and Alia Bhatt

Music
Inshalla (album), an album by Eskimo Joe
Insh'allah: The Music of Lion's Blood, by Heather Alexander 2006

Songs
"Inch'Allah" (Adamo song), 1967
"Inch'Allah" (MC Solaar song), 2002 
"Inch'Allah" (Grand Corps Malade song), 2011
"Inch'Allah", a song by Samael from the 2004 album Reign of Light
"Inshallah", a song by Goodie Mobb from the 1998 album Still Standing
"Inshallah", a song by Yaakov Shwekey from his 2016 album We Are a Miracle
"Inshallah", a song by Sting from his 2016 album 57th & 9th
"İnşallah", a song by Sıla from the album İmza
"Insha Allah", a song by Maher Zain from the album Thank You Allah

See also
Mashallah (disambiguation)